Bloomer Girl is a 1944 Broadway musical with music by Harold Arlen, lyrics by E.Y. Harburg, and a book by Sig Herzig and Fred Saidy, based on an unpublished play by writer Daniel Lewis James and his wife Lilith. The plot concerns independent Evelina Applegate, a hoop skirt manufacturer's daughter who defies her father by rejecting hoopskirts and embracing comfortable bloomers advocated by her aunt "Dolly" Bloomer, who was inspired by the women's rights advocate Amelia Bloomer. The American Civil War is looming, and abolitionist Evelina refuses to marry suitor Jeff Calhoun until he frees his slave, Pompey.

A television version of the musical was shown in 1956.

Productions

The original Broadway production opened at the Shubert Theatre on October 5, 1944, directed by William Schorr and produced by John C. Wilson in association with Nat Goldstone. The production's scenic designer and lighting designer was Lemuel Ayers. Agnes de Mille was the choreographer, and her contributions included a Civil War ballet. The production starred Celeste Holm as Evelina, David Brooks as Jeff Calhoun, Dooley Wilson as the slave Pompey, and Joan McCracken in the featured dancing role as Daisy. While successful—it closed on April 27, 1946 after 657 performances on Broadway—it has seldom been revived.

Alisa Roost directed an Off-Broadway revival, which recreated Agnes deMille's original dream ballet, at the Theatre at St. Clements in 2000 and New York City Center's Encores! staged concert series performed it for a week in 2001.

Bloomer Girl caused a temporary rift between de Mille and Jerome Robbins when, about a year into the show's run, Robbins appropriated several dancers then in the chorus, including James Mitchell and Arthur Partington, for Billion Dollar Baby (1945).

Musical numbers

Act 1
When the Boys Come Home - Serena, Octavia, Lydia, Julia, Phoebe and Delia
Evelina - Jeff Calhoun and Evalina
Welcome Hinges - Serena, Horatio, Lydia, Julia, Phoebe, Delia, Joshua Dingle, Herman Brasher, Ebenezer Mimms, Wilfred Thrush, Hiram Crump, Evalina and Jeff Calhoun
Farmer's Daughter - Joshua Dingle, Herman Brasher, Ebenezer Mimms, Wilfred Thrush and Hiram Crump
It Was Good Enough for Grandma - Evalina and the Bloomer Girls
The Eagle and Me - Pompey
Right As the Rain - Jeff Calhoun and Evalina
T'Morra', T'Morra' - Daisy
Rakish Young Man With the Whiskers - Evalina and Jeff Calhoun
Pretty As a Picture - Male Ensemble

Act 2

Sunday in Cicero Falls - Principals and Company
I Got a Song - Alexander, Augustus and Pompey
Lullaby - Evalina
Simon Legree - Second Deputy
Liza Crossing the Ice - Ensemble
 I Never Was Born - Daisy
Man For Sale - Soloist
The Eagle and Me (Reprise) - Ensemble
When the Boys Come Home (Reprise) - Entire Company

Recording
An original cast album was released on American Decca 78 RPM set DA 381 during the original Broadway run of Bloomer Girl. The recording was re-released on LP in the 1950s. It then remained out of print until the same recording became available on CD in the early 1990s.

Television production
An abridged version of the musical, which eliminated most of Agnes de Mille's choreography, except for the dance after "It Was Good Enough For Grandma" and the Civil War ballet, aired on Producers' Showcase in 1956; it starred Barbara Cook and Keith Andes and featured many of the original dancers, including James Mitchell, Lidija Franklin, Betty Low, and Emy St. Just.

Notes

References
Bordman, Gerald (2001). American Musical Theatre: A Chronicle. Third ed. New York: Oxford University Press. 
Easton, Carol (1996). No Intermissions: The Life of Agnes de Mille. New York: Little, Brown. .
Stempel, Larry (2010). Showtime: A History of the Broadway Musical Theater. New York: W. W. Norton. 
Suskin, Stephen (1990). Opening Night on Broadway: A Critical Quotebook of the Golden Era of the Musical Theatre. New York: Schirmer Books. .

External links

Bloomer Girl Guide to Musical Theatre

Broadway musicals
Musicals by Harold Arlen
1944 musicals
Musicals based on plays